Jane Fonda is an American actress and activist. In her six decade long career, she has been the recipient of numerous accolades including two Academy Awards, two British Academy Film Awards, seven Golden Globe Awards, and nominations for five Primetime Emmy Awards, and two Tony Awards.

Major industry awards

Academy Awards

BAFTA Awards

Primetime Emmy Awards

Golden Globe Awards

Screen Actors Guild Awards

Tony Awards

Other awards and nominations

AARP's Movies for Grownup Awards

Acapulco Black Film Festival

American Film Institute

American Movie Awards

Behind the Voice Actors Awards

Britannia Awards

CableACE Awards

Cannes Film Festival

CinEuphoria Awards

Critics' Choice Awards

David di Donatello Awards

Elle Women in Hollywood Awards

Film Society of Lincoln Center

Fotogramas de Plata

Dorian Awards

Gold Derby Awards

Golden Apple Award

Golden Boot Awards

Goldene Kamera Awards

Gracie Allen Awards

Hasty Pudding Theatricals

NAACP Image Awards

Jupiter Awards

Kansas City Film Critics Circle

Laurel Awards

Online Film & Television Association Awards

Santa Barbara International Film Festival

Savannah Film Festival

ShoWest Convention

Teen Choice Awards

Traverse City Film Festival

Venice Film Festival

Women Film Critics Circle

Women in Film Crystal + Lucy Awards

Golden Raspberry Awards

Hollywood Film Awards

Los Angeles Film Critics Association

People's Choice Awards

Producers Guild of America Awards

Publicists Guild of America

National Board of Review

National Society of Film Critics

New York Film Critics Circle

Satellite Awards

References

Fonda, Jane